Félix Marques Guerreiro (born 5 August 1950) is a former Portuguese footballer who played as a forward.

External links 
 
 

1939 births
Living people
Footballers from Lisbon
Portuguese footballers
Association football midfielders
Primeira Liga players
S.L. Benfica footballers
Vitória F.C. players
Segunda Divisão players
Atlético Clube de Portugal players
Portugal youth international footballers
Portugal under-21 international footballers
Portugal international footballers